DND–Faridabad–KMP Expressway (NH-148NA) is an under-construction 59 km long, 6-lane wide access-controlled expressway in Delhi NCR, India. It will connect the junction of DND Flyway and Ring Road at Maharani Bagh in Delhi with KMP Expressway at Khalilpur, Nuh district (near Sohna) in Haryana. Initially it was a separate expressway, but now it is a part of Delhi–Mumbai Expressway project. This expressway will have an additional 31 km long spur link from Sector-65, Faridabad bypass to Jewar Airport.

In Haryana, it will pass entirely through existing Faridabad bypass road. The HSVP has transferred the Faridabad bypass to NHAI for the construction of Delhi–Mumbai Expressway project.

Route

NCT of Delhi (12 km) 

 Begins in Delhi from the junction of DND Flyway and Ring Road at Maharani Bagh
 Pass through Khizrabad, Batla House and Okhla Vihar on Yamuna river's west bank
 Starts moving exactly along the Agra Canal from Okhla Vihar metro station to Mithapur
 2nd entry ramp near Kalindi Kunj metro station (towards Mithapur) for traffic from Noida
 Exits Delhi near MCD Toll, Mithapur Chowk.

Haryana (47 km)

 On Kalindi Kunj–Mithapur road, it will cross the Agra Canal at Sehatpur Bridge (Faridabad)
 Move on Faridabad bypass road from Sector-37, Faridabad to Kail Gaon near Ballabhgarh
 Interchange with Delhi–Agra (NH-2) near DPS Ballabhgarh school at Kail Gaon.
 Crosses Palwal–Sohna (NH-919) at Hajipur village (Gurgaon district)
 Toll Plaza at Kiranj (Nuh district). It is 56 km from the DND starting point.
 Trumpet interchange with KMP Expressway at Khalilpur (Nuh district).

KMP interchange
After reaching KMP interchange at Khalilpur, traffic coming from Maharani Bagh (Delhi) and Faridabad bypass has 2 options:

1. They can turn South towards Dausa and Mumbai, or turn North towards Gurgaon and Sohna.

2. They can also use KMP Expressway and turn east for Palwal and turn west for Manesar.

Construction
The construction work of the 'DND–Faridabad–KMP' section was awarded by the National Highways Authority of India (NHAI) to Dineshchandra R. Agrawal Infracon Private Limited (DRA Infracon) in August 2020. This project will reduce congestion on Ashram to Ballabhgarh route (via Badarpur). In Haryana it will have multiple Flyovers and a 3-lane service road on either side of Faridabad bypass road.

7 km out of 9 km route of Package-1 in Delhi state will be elevated with two-level crossings at 4 locations of the Delhi Metro rail line (near Okhla Vihar and Kalindi Kunj metro station), making it the 1st expressway in India to cross above elevated metro rail line. It Exits Delhi near MCD Toll tax, Mithapur which is 12.5 km from the DND starting point.

Packages
The NHAI has divided the construction work of 59 km long DND–Faridabad–KMP section of Delhi–Mumbai Expressway project into three packages and awarded it to DRA Infracon. Its construction cost is around ₹5,332 crores (including land acquisition cost).

Note: Package-2 starts at junction of Jaitpur–Pushta road and Kalindi Kunj–Mithapur road in Delhi (near NTPC Eco Park, Badarpur).

Delhi–Mumbai Expressway

The construction work of Delhi–Mumbai Expressway is divided by NHAI into 4 sections with a total of 52 tenders/ construction packages as given below. The entire 1,350 km long expressway is expected to be completed by January 2024.

Jewar Airport link

The NHAI had announced in August 2021, that an additional 31 km long spur will also be constructed from Noida International Airport in Jewar to  Faridabad bypass road on this expressway. Tender for this Spur package has been awarded by the NHAI to Apco Infratech Pvt. Ltd. on 29 July 2022.

Status updates
 Mar 2019: Foundation stone laid by Union Minister Nitin Gadkari on 1 March 2019 in Mithapur, Delhi.
 Dec 2019: NHAI invited bids for construction in 3 packages under Bharatmala Pariyojana.
 July 2020: Work awarded by NHAI to DRA Infracon Private Limited (Package-1 & Package-2).
 Aug 2020: Work awarded by NHAI to DRA Infracon Private Limited (Package-3).
 Oct 2020: Soil testing work started in Faridabad district of Haryana
 Feb 2021: Construction work is expected to start this year: NHAI.
 May 2021: Construction work started in Package-3 on 14 May 2021. Schedule completion is 24 months from the start of construction.
 Aug 2021: Construction work started in Package-2 (Faridabad bypass) on 10 August.
 Oct 2021: HSVP started demolishing illegal encroachments falling on the RoW in Faridabad.
 Jan 2022: Construction work started in Package-1 (Delhi) on 11 January.
 Mar 2022: Segment Launcher started erection of concrete structures in Maharani Bagh on 21 March. 7 km out of 9 km long (Package-1) is elevated.
 July 2022: Tender for Faridabad bypass to Jewar Airport (Spur package) has been awarded by the NHAI to Apco Infratech Pvt. Ltd. on 29 July.
 Feb 2023: The NHAI is planning to open 20 km stretch on Package-3, from Kail Gaon on NH-2 to KMP interchange at Khalilpur (Nuh district).

See also

 List of Expressways in India
 Delhi–Amritsar–Katra Expressway
 Delhi–Mumbai Expressway
 Highways in Haryana

References

Highways in India
Transport in Delhi